Samuel Bazawule (born 19 April 1982), known professionally as Blitz Bazawule, is a Ghanaian rapper, singer-songwriter, record producer, author, artist, and filmmaker based in Brooklyn, NY.

Early life
Samuel Bazawule was born in Accra, Ghana, in April 1982. He is the third of four children and attended the renowned Achimota School. While in school, he amassed awards for his visual art, but later developed an obsession with hip hop music after hearing his older brother play the classic Public Enemy album It Takes a Nation of Millions to Hold Us Back. Drawing on his love for history and social observation, he began to research and write historically loaded rhymes for which he became famous in school.

Musical career
After graduation from Achimota School in 2000, Bazawule was first recognized by Ghanaian Ace producer Hammer of The Last Two. Blitz was asked to come to the studio the next day after impressing Hammer with his skills. He recorded a verse on the song "Deeba" and - in the fashion of one of his idols, Nas, gained instant notoriety and received an award for Best New Artist at the 2000 Ghana Music Awards. Soon after, in 2001, he moved to the United States to study at Kent State University in Ohio. It was while studying for his bachelor's degree in Business Administration that he developed his skills as a live artist, performing at several live shows and opening for iconic rappers such as Rakim. as well as recording a self-released album, Soul Rebel (2004), under the moniker Blitz.

After graduation, Blitz moved to New York City to pursue his dream. There, Blitz recorded another album, Double Consciousness (2005), and more recently he released Stereotype, a live-instrument-heavy musical exploration, that tests the limits of Hip Hop. The album draws from his diverse musical background. In order to achieve the live sound he was looking for, he formed a band, The Embassy Ensemble, and brushed off his own djembe skills.

After three long years of recording, Blitz took the album to several major labels. Getting the major label run around one too many times, Blitz decided to release it independently. He established a label, Embassy MVMT, and is now connected to The Roots community initiative Okayplayer.

In late 2009, he was chosen as of one Beyond Race magazine's "50 Emerging Artists", resulting in a spot in the publication's #11 issue (with Bodega Girls and J. Cole on the cover), as well as an exclusive Q&A for the magazine's site.  In 2015, Blitz received the Vilcek Prize for Creative Promise in Contemporary Music.

In 2011, he released "Feelin' High" with the French singer Ben Mazue, and in 2012, he was featured on the album Tetra by the French electronic crew C2C. Blitz has also frequently collaborated with Professor A.L.I. featuring on "Things Fall Apart" along with Raekwon in 2011, on the remix "Things Still Fall Apart" in 2012, and on his song "The Mic Shall Inherit The Earth" off of the "XFactor" album in 2015.

Other work 
Bazaule directed The Burial Of Kojo, which became the Golden Globes' first Ghanaian entry, and the first original movie from Ghana to be released on the Netflix streaming platform. Bazawule was the recipient of one of the Guggenheim Fellowships for film due to this film. Bazawule starred in the 2019 Whitney Biennial curated by Rujeko Hockley and Jane Panetta. Bazawule directed segments of Beyoncé's visual album Black Is King. Bazawule wrote his first book, The Scent of Burnt Flowers which was published on June 28, 2022. On March 17, 2022, it was announced that FX would produce a six-episode miniseries based on the book, with Bazawule directing and producing as well as Yahya Abdul-Mateen II starring.

Discography

Studio albums 
2009: Stereotype
2011: Native Sun
2014: Afropolitan Dreams
2016: Diasporadical

Soundtrack albums 
2019: The Burial of Kojo

EPs 
2004: Soul Rebel
2005: Double Consciousness
2009: StereoLive
2013: The Warm Up

Filmography

Feature films 
2018: The Burial of Kojo
2020: Black Is King
2023: The Color Purple

Short films 
2011: Native Sun
2016: Diasporadical Trilogia

Television 

 TBA: The Scent of Burnt Flowers

References

External links
 
 Sam Blitz Bazawule - IMDb
 Ghanaian rapper Blitz the Ambassador - PRI

1982 births
Living people
Alumni of Achimota School
Ghanaian film directors
Ghanaian hip hop musicians
Ghanaian emigrants to the United States
Kent State University alumni
People from Accra